José Angel Peña Carballo (born 10 December 1994) is a Salvadoran professional footballer who plays as a forward.

Club career

FAS 
Peña signed with C.D. FAS for the Clausura 2015. With the team of Santa Ana, he reached the semi-finals of that tournament, but they were defeated by Isidro Metapán 1–2 on aggregate. On 20 December 2015, FAS reached the Apertura 2015 final, but lost against Alianza F.C. Peña was a starter in that final.

Isidro Metapán 
Peña signed with Isidro Metapán in 2016. On 7 December 2017, Peña scored the only goal of the 1–0 victory against Santa Tecla FC in the first leg of the semi-finals of the Apertura 2017. However, Isidro Metapán was subsequently eliminated.

Municipal Limeño 
Peña signed with Municipal Limeño for the Clausura 2018.

Alianza 
Peña signed with Alianza for the Apertura 2018. On 5 August 2018, Peña scored his first goal in a 3–3 draw against Municipal Limeño at the Estadio Cuscatlán.

On 8 December 2018, he scored two crucial goals in the 2–2 draw against FAS of the second leg of the semi-finals of the Apertura 2018. Alianza reached its fifth consecutive final since the Apertura 2016.

Honours

Player

Club
C.D. FAS
 Primera División
 Runners-up: Apertura 2015

Alianza F.C.
 Primera División
 Runners-up: Apertura 2018

References

External links
 José Ángel Peña at Soccerway 

1994 births
Living people
Salvadoran footballers
El Salvador international footballers
Association football forwards
C.D. FAS footballers
Alianza F.C. footballers
Sportspeople from San Salvador
Central American Games bronze medalists for El Salvador
Central American Games medalists in football